Jacques Waben (c. 1590, Alkmaar – c. 1634, Hoorn), was a Dutch Golden Age portrait painter.

Biography
According to Houbraken he was a good portrait and history painter, who painted both small and large pieces. Houbraken admired the history of Joseph in 4 panels that hung in the Proveniers Hof in Hoorn when he was writing. He also saw a history of Jephthah dated 1602, at the Hoorn home of the painter Johannes Bronkhorst.

According to the RKD many of his paintings survive in local private collections and the Westfries Museum.

References

1590s births
1630s deaths
Dutch Golden Age painters
Dutch male painters
People from Hoorn